Adelophryne baturitensis is a species of frog in the family Eleutherodactylidae. It is endemic to north-eastern Brazil and is known from its type locality, Serra de Baturité (or Maçico de Baturité) in the state of Ceará.

Description
Adult males measure  and adult females  in snout–vent length. The head is longer than it is wide. The snout is truncate in dorsal view and rounded in profile. The tympanum is small but distinct. There is no supra-tympanic fold and the canthus rostralis is indistinct. The fingers have no webbing and only the fingers III–IV have small discs. The toes have no webbing but have small discs. The skin is smooth. The dorsal coloration is brown; there is a darker pattern starting from between the eyes. The snout and the sides are brown. There is a dark brown band running from the snout to the sides and tapering towards the groin. The limbs have cross-bands. The iris is gold.

Habitat and conservation
The Pernambuco locality is an Atlantic Rainforest remnant.

The species is threatened by habitat loss caused by logging, agriculture, and human settlement; it occurs in areas of good soil and climate, favoring agricultural expansion.

References

Further reading
Composition, distribution patterns, and conservation priority areas for the herpetofauna of the state of Ceará, northeastern Brazil

baturitensis
Endemic fauna of Brazil
Amphibians of Brazil
Amphibians described in 1994
Taxa named by Marinus Steven Hoogmoed
Taxonomy articles created by Polbot